Jermaine Fordah (born 17 April 1993) is an English footballer who plays as a goalkeeper for Western Mass Pioneers.

Career
Fordah was born in London and spent time with Luton Town and in non-league football whilst growing up. In 2014 he moved to America for the first time and joined New York Red Bulls II, before returning to England to spend time training with West Ham United. He then returned to the States to play for AC Connecticut and New York Cosmos B in USL League Two and the National Premier Soccer League respectively. In February 2019, he signed a deal to join newly formed USL Championship side El Paso Locomotive. On 16 May 2019, he made his debut for El Paso, playing the full match in a 3–0 defeat to Forward Madison in the second round of the U.S. Open Cup. On 21 July 2019, Fordah made his USL Championship debut, keeping a clean sheet in a goalless draw with Real Monarchs. On 19 February 2021, Fordah joined Loudoun United FC ahead of the 2021 season. In 2022, he was playing for USL League Two side Western Mass Pioneers.

Career statistics

Club

Notes

References

1993 births
Living people
English footballers
English expatriate footballers
Association football goalkeepers
USL Championship players
Luton Town F.C. players
Lewes F.C. players
Ware F.C. players
Banbury United F.C. players
AC Connecticut players
New York Cosmos B players
New York Cosmos players
El Paso Locomotive FC players
Loudoun United FC players
English expatriate sportspeople in the United States
Expatriate soccer players in the United States
Western Mass Pioneers players